In enzymology, an ADP-L-glycero-D-manno-heptose 6-epimerase is an enzyme that catalyzes the chemical reaction

ADP-D-glycero-D-manno-heptose  ADP-L-glycero-D-manno-heptose

Hence, this enzyme has one substrate, ADP-D-glycero-D-manno-heptose, and one product, ADP-L-glycero-D-manno-heptose.

This enzyme belongs to the family of isomerases, specifically those racemases and epimerases acting on carbohydrates and derivatives.  The systematic name of this enzyme class is ADP-L-glycero-D-manno-heptose 6-epimerase. This enzyme participates in lipopolysaccharide biosynthesis.  It employs one cofactor, NADP+ in a direct oxidation mechanism.

Structural studies

As of 2007, only one structure has been solved for this class of enzymes, with the PDB accession code .

References

 
 
 

EC 5.1.3
NADH-dependent enzymes
Enzymes of known structure